is a professional Japanese baseball player. He is a pitcher for the Hiroshima Toyo Carp of Nippon Professional Baseball (NPB).

References 

1996 births
Living people
Baseball people from Fukuoka Prefecture
Nippon Professional Baseball pitchers
Hiroshima Toyo Carp players
People from Fukutsu, Fukuoka